Pungoteague is a census-designated place (CDP) in Accomack County, Virginia, United States. It was first listed as a CDP in 2010. Per the 2020 census, the population was 346.

The name itself is a derivative of the Indian term "Pungotekw," which means Sand Fly River and is the name used by the earliest inhabitants.

In late summer of 1665, William Darby and two of his friends dared present a play at Cowle's Tavern. Entitled Ye Bear and Ye Cub, this drama is believed to have been the first theater performance of an English-language play in the American colonies.

Another notable local landmark is Saint George's Church.  It is believed that the first meetings of the Pungoteague Episcopal congregation were held in 1636, with the church's first building being constructed from 1666 to 1676. The original frame church was replaced in 1736 by a brick structure in the Flemish-bond pattern. It was added to the National Register of Historic Places in 1970. Shepherd's Plain was added in 1982.

In the mid-19th century, Pungoteague was a point along the stagecoach route between Wilmington, Delaware and Eastville, Virginia.

Geography

It lies at an elevation of 26 feet.

Demographics

2020 census

Note: the US Census treats Hispanic/Latino as an ethnic category. This table excludes Latinos from the racial categories and assigns them to a separate category. Hispanics/Latinos can be of any race.

References

Virginia Trend Report 2: State and Complete Places (Sub-state 2010 Census Data)

Census-designated places in Accomack County, Virginia
Census-designated places in Virginia